Steven R. Kutcher (born January 9, 1944) is an American entomologist who has worked for decades as a "wrangler" of insects and other arthropods in some of the highest-grossing productions and with some of the most famous people in the entertainment industry. In doing so, he has gained media attention worldwide as "The Bug Man of Hollywood."
In recent years, Kutcher has attracted additional notice by using insects as "living brushes" to create "Bug Art," while continuing his work as a naturalist and an educator.

Background, education, and training 

Born in Manhattan, New York, Steven R. Kutcher as a young child collected fireflies in the Catskill Mountains. Later growing up in a suburb of Los Angeles, California, Kutcher collected insects around his home, in fields, and in the Santa Monica Mountains. At age 19, Kutcher traveled 3000 miles around Mexico, exploring desert to tropical ecosystems.

Kutcher received a bachelors degree in entomology from the University of California, Davis, in 1968; and a Master of Science degree in biology from the California State University, Long Beach, in 1975. His formal studies focused on insect behavior — in particular the aggregating behavior of the milkweed bug, Oncopeltus fasciitis — as he observed in the field, in laboratory experiments, and in time-lapse cinematography.

In 1970, Kutcher began his work in the entertainment industry as "Larry J. Felix" in The Stein and Illes Radio Show, a comedic "underground" radio show on KUSC, in Southern California; James R. Stein and Robert Illes would both become Emmy Award–winning TV writers and producers. Kutcher received comedic training from Bill Cosby and once had Robin Williams as an audience.

"The Bug Man of Hollywood" 

Since 1977, Kutcher has manipulated the instinctive behaviors of arthropods, and the instinctive reactions of audiences, mostly in the horror, thriller, fantasy, and comedy genres. He has worked on over 100 feature films with a "bug" in the story line, including Spider-Man (2002), Jurassic Park, and Arachnophobia. Kutcher has also worked on numerous popular television shows—including  CSI: NY, MacGyver, and The X-Files – as well as TV commercials and online advertising for Fortune 500 corporations. (See Filmography and other credits, with featured "bugs," below).

In film, on TV and radio, and in music videos, Kutcher has notably worked with some of the most famous people in the entertainment industry, including Paula Abdul, Christina Aguilera, Steve Allen, Halle Berry, Carol Burnett, Marlon Brando, Richard Burton, Bill Cosby, Wes Craven, M.C. Hammer, Janet Jackson, Michael Jackson, James Earl Jones, David Lynch, Carl Reiner, Steven Spielberg, Denzel Washington, Sigourney Weaver, Robin Williams, and Stevie Wonder.

As "The Bug Man of Hollywood," Kutcher has himself been the subject of numerous interviews. He has appeared, with "bugs," on late-night TV talk shows, including The Tonight Show Starring Johnny Carson and Late Night with David Letterman. In 1992, Kutcher appeared as a guest on the Emmy-nominated "Spider Episode" of the TV talk show parody The Larry Sanders Show, starring Garry Shandling. In 1998, Kutcher appeared on the British TV children's show The Scoop, which won a BAFTA award.
Kutcher has also been interviewed or featured in numerous publications in print and online, including Entertainment Weekly, Guinness Book of Records, Los Angeles Times, National Enquirer, National Geographic World, Nature, Newsweek, New York Times, Popular Science, Ripley's Believe It or Not, Time, The Wall Street Journal, Weekly Reader, and Wired as well as periodicals in Australia, Germany, Italy, Japan, and the United Kingdom. (See Further reading, below.)

Manipulating insect behavior 

Applying his academic and professional studies of arthropod behaviors, Kutcher manipulates instinctive responses—such as species-specific, positive or negative sensitivity to light, air pressure, or gravity to make "bugs" perform scripted "tricks" on cue, such as:

 A live wasp flies harmlessly into the mouth of actor Roddy McDowell.
 A cockroach runs across the floor and then, "hitting its mark", flips over on its back.
 A spider crawls across a room and then into a slipper.
 A cockroach crawls out of a shoe, walks up a bag of snack food and onto a surfing magazine, and then stops upon a picture of a surfboard.
 A praying mantis, a scorpion, and beetles power-up a cell phone as part of a "Bug Circus" in online ad (a la a traditional flea circus).
 Hundreds of bees or thousands of locusts swarm on camera as called for in the script.

"Bug Art" 

In the 1980s, for a Steven Spielberg television project, Steven Kutcher made a fly walk through ink and leave footprints as directed.
Since 2000, Steven Kutcher has been creating "Bug Art," using various arthropods as "living brushes" to apply gouache and other nontoxic paints on watercolor paper.
"I use water-based, nontoxic paints that easily wash off", he says. "I have to take good care of them. After all, they are artists!"
The abstract to surrealistic compositions are shaped by Kutcher's methods of manipulating insect movements, and are often influenced by the works of Impressionist and other master painters.

Contributions as scientist, naturalist, and educator 

Steven Kutcher has appeared in person to give talks and live-insect demonstrations at hundreds of film festivals, seminars and workshops, museums and libraries, and preschools through graduate schools.
Kutcher has been instrumental in creating annual insect fairs, as at the Los Angeles County Museum of Natural History and Los Angeles County Arboretum, which have been attended by more than 100,000 children and adults. Kutcher also served as a consultant in the development of the interactive "bug" exhibits at the Kidspace Children's Museum, in Pasadena, California.

Kutcher has taught outdoor education workshops for such environmental organizations as the Audubon Society, the Sierra Club, and Tree People. With a milkweed butterfly garden of his own, Kutcher is on the board of the Monarch Program
Kutcher has consulted on the biology and control of arthropods for major corporations and government agencies, such as the Greater Los Angeles County Vector Control District.

For over 30 years, Kutcher has taught entomology, zoology, and biology courses at several community colleges in the greater Los Angeles area.

Filmography and other credits (in part)

Theatrical films 

In addition to serving as "bug wrangler" or entomology consultant for numerous student and independent films, Kutcher has worked on many feature films from major studios and production companies:

TV movies and series

Music videos

TV and online commercials

See also 

 Animal training, citing "niche" filled by Steven Kutcher.
 Arthropods in film, citing work by Steven R. Kutcher.
 List of The Tonight Show Starring Johnny Carson episodes (1990), Jay Leno (guest host), with Steve Kutcher as guest, Ep. No. 4201, August 7, 1990.
 Steatoda grossa, citing work by Steven Kutcher with that species of spider in Spider-Man.

References

External links

Further reading

Periodicals

Journals and books 

 
 
 
 
 
 
 
 
 
 
 
 
 
 
 
 
 
 
 

1944 births
Living people
American entomologists
Animal trainers
University of California, Davis alumni
California State University, Long Beach alumni